The Nigeria Pitch Awards are awards presented to Nigerian former and present sports people, administrators and journalists in recognition of their positive contributions to sports in Nigeria. Initiated by Matchmakers Consult International Limited and approved by the Nigeria Football Federation, the first Nigeria Pitch Awards ceremony was held on November 16, 2013 in Calabar, Cross River State, Nigeria.

Ceremonies
2013 – 1st Nigeria Pitch Awards
2015 – 2nd Nigeria Pitch Awards
2016  3rd Nigeria Pitch Awards
2017  4th Nigeria Pitch Awards
2018  5th Nigeria Pitch Awards

Categories
The award was initiated with 16 categories until March 10, 2016 when 6 categories were added. The following are the current categories:

Players category
Goalkeeper of the Year
Defender of the Year
Midfielder of the Year
Striker of the Year
Rashidi Yekini Award
Sam Okwaraji Award
MVP (Men) in the NPFL Award
MVP (Women) in the NPFL Award
Queen of the Pitch
King of the Pitch

Club category
Club of the Year
Manager of the Year
Coach of the Year
Most Valuable Player (Women) in the Nigeria Professional Football League
Most Valuable Player (Men) in the Nigeria Professional Football League

Official's category
Referee of the Year
Players' Agent of the Year

State category
State with the Best Grassroots Football Development Programme
Football Friendly Governor of the Year

Media category
Football Journalist of the Year (Print)
Football Journalist of the Year (TV)
Football Journalist of the Year (Radio)

Corporate category
Corporate Sponsor of Football Award
Honorary
Special Achievement Award
Football Achievement Award

Past editions

1st Nigeria Pitch Awards
The first edition of the Nigeria Pitch Awards was held on November 16, 2013 at the Transcorp Metropolitan Hotel in Calabar, Cross River State with notable sports and government personalities in attendance.

Winners
Goalkeeper of the Year – Vincent Enyeama
Defender of the Year – Godfrey Oboabona
Midfielder of the Year – Mikel John Obi
Striker of the Year – Emmanuel Emenike
Coach of the Year – Stephen Keshi
Manager of the Year – Felix Anyansi-Agwu
Club of the Year – Kano Pillars F.C.
Referee of the Year – Jelili Ogunmuyiwa
Players' Agent of the Year – John Olatunji Shittu
State with the Best Grassroots Football Development Programme – Lagos State
Football Journalist of the Year (Print) – Ade Ojeikere
Football Journalist of the Year (Radio) – Bimbo Adeola
Football Journalist of the Year (TV) – Toyin Ibitoye
Football Achievement Awards – Aminu Maigari, Musa Amadu and Chris Green
Special Recognition Awards – Jay-Jay Okocha, Rafiu Ladipo, Gideon Akinsola and Paul Bassey

2nd Nigeria Pitch Awards
The 2nd Nigeria Pitch Awards ceremony was held on June 13, 2015 in Abuja following a change in the schedule which was originally slated to hold on May 6, 2015 in Lagos. The ceremony saw Vincent Enyeama, Toyin Ibitoye, Bimbo Adeola and Felix Anyansi-Agwu retain Goalkeeper of the Year, Football Journalist of the Year (TV), Football Journalist of the Year (Radio) and Manager of the Year awards.

Winners
Goalkeeper of the Year – Vincent Enyeama
Defender of the Year – Kenneth Omeruo
Midfielder of the Year – Ogenyi Onazi
Striker of the Year – Ahmed Musa
Referee of the Year – Ferdinand Udoh
Club of the Year – Kano Pillars F.C.
Coach of the Year – Okey Emordi
Manager of the Year – Felix Anyansi-Agwu
Football Friendly Governor of the Year – Liyel Imoke
State with the Best Graasroots Football Development Programme – Lagos State
Football Journalist of the Year (Print) – Tana Aiyejina
Football Journalist of the Year (Radio) – Bimbo Adeola
Football Journalist of the Year (TV) – Toyin Ibitoye
Queen of the Pitch – Asisat Oshoala
King of the Pitch – Vincent Enyeama

3rd Nigeria Pitch Awards
The 3rd Nigeria Pitch Awards ceremony was held on March 25, 2016, in at Hotel Seventeen in Kaduna. At the ceremony, Assisat Oshoala and Tana Aiyejina retained their awards as Queen of the Pitch and Football Journalist of the Year. The ceremony was witnessed by The Governor of Kaduna State, Mallam Nasir El-Rufai, Honourable Minister of Youth and Sports Development, Barr. Solomon Dalong, the NFF President, Amaju Pinnick, NFF 2nd Vice President, Shehu Dikko and other board members. Also present were Sir Mike Okiro, Chairman, Police Service Commission, Pastor Ituah Ighodalo, Managing Partner, SIAO Partners, Kunle Soname, Chairman, Bet9ja, Super Eagles Interim Coach, Samson Siasia, Super Eagles Captain, Mikel John Obi and all members of the Super Eagles and coaching crew.

Winners
 Ikechukwu Ezenwa - Goal Keeper of the Year
 Chinedu Udoji  - Defender of the Year
 Paul Onobi   - Midfielder of the Year
 Odion Ighalo  - Striker of the Year
 Gbolahan Salami   - Rasheedi Yekini Award
 Gbolahan Salami  - MVP (Men) in the NPFL
 Ngozi Ebere  - MVP (Women) in the Nigeria women Premier League
 Enyimba FC   - Club of the Year
 U-17 Golden Eaglet  - Team of the Year
 Emmanuel Amuneke - Coach of the Year
 Kadiri Ikhana  - Manager of the Year
 Ferdinand Udoh  _ Referee of the Year
 John Olatunji Shittu - Player’s Agent of the Year
 Lagos State  _ State with the Best Grassroots Football     Development Programme
 H.E Nyesom Wike - Football Friendly Governor of the Year
 Tana Aiyejina  _ Football Journalist of the Year – Print
 Godwin Enakhena - Football Journalist of the Year –Radio
 Austin Okon-Akpan _ Football Journalist of the Year –TV
 Globacom  _ Gold-Corporate Sponsor of Football
 Guinness   - Silver- Corporate Sponsor of Football
 Supersport  -       Bronze- Corporate Sponsor of Football
 Segun Odegbami  _ Sam Okwaraji Awards
 Amaju Pinnick  - Sam Okwaraji Awards
 Mikel John Obi       _ Sam Okwaraji Awards
 Asisat Oshoala  - Queen of the Pitch
 Odion Ighalo  - King of the Pitch
 HE Nasir El-Rufai - Special Achievement Award
 Barr. Solomon Dalong - Special Achievement Award
 Sir Mike Mbama Okiro - Special Achievement Award
 Dr Mohammed Sanusi - Special Achievement Award
 Samson Siasia  - Football Achievement Award

References

External links

Association football trophies and awards by country
Awards established in 2013